Quickly Kevin, Will He Score? is a nostalgia podcast based around association football in the 1990s. Guests have included former professional footballers, comedians, and sports television presenters.

Hosted by Josh Widdicombe with friends Michael Marden (a TV editor who has worked on programmes such as Would I Lie to You?) and Chris Scull, the podcast name derives from the commentary heard in Britain during the penalty shoot out between England and Argentina at the 1998 FIFA World Cup when Brian Moore asked Kevin Keegan how David Batty would fare with a decisive penalty, which Batty then subsequently missed (although the actual dialogue, which is used in the opening credits, is "Do you back him to score. Quickly: yes or no?").

The show was nominated for Best Sports Podcast at the 2018 British Podcast Awards, for which it received a bronze award. It was previously nominated for best sports podcast at the 2017 Football Supporters Federation Awards.

Episodes

Season One
 Episode 1 - Matt Le Tissier
 Episode 2 - Elis James
 Episode 3 - Paul Merson
 Episode 4 - Miles Jacobson
 Episode 5 - Tom Craine
 Episode 6 - Jim Rosenthal
 Episode 7 - Ian Pearce
 Episode 8 - Nish Kumar
 Episode 9 - Ivo Graham
 Episode 10 - Matt Forde
 Episode 11 - Iain Dowie
 Episode 12 - Quiz

Season Two
 Episode 1 - Frank Skinner
 Episode 2 - Darren Anderton
 Episode 3 - Dermot Gallagher
 Episode 4 - Tom Parry
 Episode 5 - Mark Lawrenson
 Episode 6 - James Acaster
 Episode 7 - Matt Lorenzo
 Episode 8 - Matt Forde 
 Episode 9 - Tom Craine 
 Episode 10 - Graeme Le Saux
 Episode 11 - Quiz

Season Three
 Episode 1 - James Richardson
 Episode 2 - Lee Dixon
 Episode 3 - Ivo Graham
 Episode 4 - Tony Dorigo
 Episode 5 - Elis James
 Episode 6 - Pat Nevin
 Episode 7 - Tom Parry
 Episode 8 - Quiz

2018 World Cup Specials
 World Cup Episode 1 - The Opening Ceremony
 World Cup Episode 2 - Goalkeepers
 World Cup Episode 3 - TV theme music
 World Cup Episode 4 - Midfielders
 World Cup Episode 5 - Strikers
 World Cup Episode 6 - Mascots
 World Cup Episode 7 - Memorabilia
 World Cup Episode 8 - Adverts
 World Cup Episode 9 - Defenders
 World Cup Episode 10 - The Closing Ceremony

2018 Pre-Season
 Episode 1 - Team of the 90s  (Goalkeepers)
 Episode 2 - Team of the 90s (Centre-backs)
 Episode 3 - Team of the 90s (Full backs)
 Episode 4 - Team of the 90s (Midfielders)
 Episode 5 - Team of the 90s (Strikers)

Season Four
 Episode 1 - Bobby Gould
 Episode 2 - Alex Brooker
 Episode 3 - Gary Neville
 Episode 4 - Alastair Campbell
 Episode 5 - Stuart Pearce
 Episode 6 - Tom Craine
 Episode 7 - John Moncur
 Episode 8 - Quiz

2019 Pre Season
 Episode 1 - 90s Football Computer Games
 Episode 2 - 90s Football TV Shows
 Episode 3 - Things We Miss About 90s Football
 Episode 4 - Memorabilia
 Episode 5 - The Non 90s Episode Idea Pitch Episode
 Episode 6 - Best and Worst Goals of the 90s
 Episode 7 - Players
 Episode 8 - Correspondence and Poll results special
 Episode 9 - Championship Manager 97/98 with Tom Craine

Season Five
 Episode 1 - Ivo Graham
 Episode 2 - Dara Ó Briain
 Episode 3 - Alan Curbishley
 Episode 4 - Tom Davis
 Episode 5 - Darren Huckerby
 Episode 6 - Benjamin Partridge
 Episode 7 - Max Rushden
 Episode 8 - Quiz

Season Six
 Episode 1 - Steve Bull
 Episode 2 - Clive Tyldesley
 Episode 3 - Charlie Baker
 Episode 4 - Dave Beasant
 Episode 5 - Ben Clark
 Episode 6 - Jon Hare
 Episode 7 - Richard Shaw
 Episode 8 - Benjamin Partridge
 Episode 9 - Carlton Palmer
 Episode 10 - Quiz

Season Seven
 Episode 1 - Welcome Back
 Episode 2 - Jamie Redknapp
 Episode 3 - Jason Manford
 Episode 4 - Bonus correspondence special
 Episode 5 - Ivo Graham
 Episode 6 - Neville Southall
 Episode 7 - Andy Townsend
 Episode 8 - Mike Ingham
 Episode 9 - Did somebody say 'bonus episode'?
 Episode 10 - Jamie Carragher
 Episode 11 - Bob Mills
 Episode 12 - John Robins
 Episode 13 - Henning Wehn
 Episode 14 - Quiz

Season Eight
 Episode 1 - A Whole New Ball Game
 Episode 2 - Ramon Vega
 Episode 3 - Lloyd Griffith
 Episode 4 - Tom Craine
 Episode 5 - Ian Moore
 Episode 6 - Harry Redknapp
 Episode 7 - Suggs
 Episode 8 - Trevor Steven
 Episode 9 - Quiz

Euro 2020
 Episode 1 - Monday 14 June
 Episode 2 - Wednesday 16 June
 Episode 3 - Friday 18 June
 Episode 4 - Monday 21 June
 Episode 5 - Wednesday 23 June
 Episode 6 - Friday 25 June
 Episode 7 - Monday 28 June
 Episode 8 - England vs. Germany
 Episode 9 - Friday 2 July
 Episode 10 - Monday 5 July
 Episode 11 - Wednesday 7 July
 Episode 12 - Friday 9 July
 Episode 13 - England vs. Italy
 Episode 14 - End of Euros Awards Show

Season Nine
 Episode 1 - How Steve Froggatt met his wife...
 Episode 2 - Phil Thompson
 Episode 3 - Caroline Barker
 Episode 4 - Ben Clark
 Episode 5 - Andreas Brehme
 Episode 6 - This Month in the 90s (September 1996)
 Episode 7 - This Month in the 90s (May 1995)
 Episode 8 - Nick Hancock
 Episode 9 - James Gill
 Episode 10 - Matt Forde
 Episode 11 - Quiz

Season Ten
 Episode 1 - Bryan Robson
 Bonus Episode - Tony Adams
 Episode 2 - Joe Wilkinson
 Episode 3 - Jarlath Regan
 Episode 4 - This Month in the 90s (May 1997)
 Episode 5 - Susie McCabe
 Episode 6 - Paul Hawksbee
 Episode 7 - Quiz

Season Eleven
 Episode 1 - Peter Reid
 Episode 2 - Lee Sharpe
 Episode 3 - Geoff Norcott
 Episode 4 - James Brown
 Episode 5 - Dion Dublin
 Episode 6 - Maisie Adam
 Episode 7 - Thom Gibbs
 Episode 8 - Martin Tyler
 Episode 9 - Steve McManaman
 Episode 10- Quiz

2022 World Cup Specials
 Episode 1 - The Preview (part 1)
 Episode 2 - The Preview (part 2)
 Episode 3 - England vs Iran
 Episode 4 - Preview England vs USA
 Episode 5 - England vs USA (the aftermath)
 Episode 6 - England vs Wales (Preview)
 Episode 7 - The World Cup starts now!!
 Episode 8 - England vs Senegal preview
 Episode 9 - This is what it feels like to be good
 Episode 10 - France QF Preview
 Episode 11 - Par for the course
 Episode 12 - It Ends Not With A Bang, But A Whimper...

References

Sports podcasts